Joel Savage (born December 25, 1969) is a Canadian former professional ice hockey player. Savage was drafted in the first round, 13th overall, by the Buffalo Sabres in the 1988 NHL Entry Draft. Savage played three NHL games, which came during the 1990–91 season with the Sabres. Savage played his junior hockey career with the Victoria Cougars of the Western Hockey League, compiling 143 points in 197 games.

Playing career
Savage's North American professional career included stints with the Rochester Americans of the American Hockey League (1989–1993) and Fort Wayne Komets (1992–1994), San Diego Gulls (1993–1994), and Kalamazoo Wings (1993–1994) of the International Hockey League. Savage also played in 39 games with the Canadian National Team between 1994 and 1996.

Savage played several seasons professionally in Europe before retiring following the 2003–2004 season. In Europe, he played with the Starbulls Rosenheim, Frankfurt Lions, and Adler Mannheim of Deutsche Eishockey Liga in Germany, and HC Lugano and EV Zug of Nationalliga A in Switzerland. In 2002, he became a Swiss citizen through marriage. Savage eventually returned to Canada and settled in Cranbrook, British Columbia, where he is the President of Havaday Developments Inc., which is the developer of the Wildstone golf resort in Cranbrook in partnership with Gary Player.

Career statistics

Regular season and playoffs

External links
 

1969 births
Living people
Adler Mannheim players
Buffalo Sabres draft picks
Buffalo Sabres players
Canadian emigrants to Switzerland
Canadian expatriate ice hockey players in Germany
Canadian expatriate ice hockey players in Switzerland
EV Zug players
Fort Wayne Komets players
Frankfurt Lions players
HC Lugano players
Ice hockey people from British Columbia
Kalamazoo Wings (1974–2000) players
Kelowna Spartans players
National Hockey League first-round draft picks
Naturalised citizens of Switzerland
Rochester Americans players
San Diego Gulls (IHL) players
Sportspeople from Surrey, British Columbia
Swiss ice hockey right wingers
Swiss people of Canadian descent
Starbulls Rosenheim players
Victoria Cougars (WHL) players